Ecogen Energy is a power station operator in Victoria, Australia. It operates two peaking power plants: the natural gas fired Newport Power Station and Jeeralang Power Station.

Until 1999 Ecogen Energy was a trading name of Generation Victoria, and was the operator of gas powered power stations. The company was sold by the State Government of Victoria in March 1999 to AES Corporation subsidiary AES Transpower for $361 million, $350 million going in debt reduction and the state receiving $11 million.

AES Transpower sold Ecogen Energy in December 2002 to Babcock & Brown and their investment offshoot Prime Infrastructure for $81 million. A 73% stake was sold to Babcock & Brown Power in 2006 for $59 million. Babcock & Brown Power sold its 73% interest to co-shareholder Industry Funds Management in 2008 for $87 million, which held the remainder of the shares. In 2018, Ecogen was sold by IFM Investors to EnergyAustralia for $205 million.

References

External links
 Ecogen Energy Sale Agreement (26 March 1999)

Electric power companies of Australia